Lapinskaya is a rural locality (a village) in Kargopolsky District, Arkhangelsk Oblast, Russia. The population was 10 as of 2012.

Geography 
Lapinskaya is located 20 km south of Kargopol (the district's administrative centre) by road. Sidorovskaya is the nearest rural locality.

References 

Rural localities in Kargopolsky District